Bart Ravensbergen (born 14 March 1993) is a Dutch handball player for HSG Nordhorn-Lingen and the Dutch national team.

He represented the Netherlands at the 2020 European Men's Handball Championship.

References

External links

1993 births
Living people
Dutch male handball players
People from Voorschoten
Expatriate handball players
Dutch expatriate sportspeople in Germany
HSG Nordhorn-Lingen players
Handball-Bundesliga players
Sportspeople from South Holland
21st-century Dutch people